jkvr. Mariane Catherine van Hogendorp (August 8, 1834, The Hague – September 17, 1909, Lausanne), a member of the Van Hogendorp family, was a Dutch feminist.

Life
Hogendorp was born on 8 August 1834 in The Hague. She married Aarnout Klerck in 1875 ending with his death in 1876.

Hogendorp was the founder of the Nederlandsche Vrouwenbond ter Verhooging van het Zedelijk Bewustzijn (NPV), an influential women's organisation which worked for  against prostitution, which she managed alongside her sister  in 1883–1909. She also worked on issues surrounding prostitution with the English feminist Josephine Butler.

Hogendorp was a member of the Vereeniging voor Vrouwenkiesrecht from 1894 to 1909, and the representative of the Netherlands in the international women's movement in 1900.  She was president of the Vrienden der Armen Association from 1874 to 1900.

She died in Lausanne, Switzerland on September 17, 1909.

References

1834 births
1909 deaths
19th-century Dutch people
Anti-prostitution activists
Dutch feminists
Dutch suffragists
Dutch women's rights activists
Jonkvrouws of the Netherlands